Virginia Algonquian may refer to:

 Powhatan, also known as Virginia Algonquians, are a Native American tribe Indigenous to Virginia, U.S.
 Powhatan language, an extinct language spoken by the Powhatan or Virginia Algonquians